Karl Gustaf Jonsson (7 July 1903 – 30 July 1990) was a Swedish cross-country skier. He competed in the 50 km event at the 1928 and 1932 Olympics and won a silver medal in 1928, finishing ninth four years later.

At the Nordic World Ski Championships he placed fourth-fifth in the 30 km and 50 km events in 1926 and 1929. In 1930 he finished second in the Vasa run, and in 1925 won the national 30 km title.

During his career Jonsson was considered a waxing expert, and later became a ski wax producer. He was featured in the 1988 documentary film De sista skidåkarna (The Last Skiers).

Cross-country skiing results
All results are sourced from the International Ski Federation (FIS).

Olympic Games
 1 medal – (1 silver)

World Championships

References

External links

databaseOlympics

1903 births
1990 deaths
Swedish male cross-country skiers
Cross-country skiers at the 1928 Winter Olympics
Cross-country skiers at the 1932 Winter Olympics
Olympic silver medalists for Sweden
Olympic medalists in cross-country skiing
Medalists at the 1928 Winter Olympics
20th-century Swedish people